The women's high jump at the 1971 European Athletics Championships was held in Helsinki, Finland, at Helsinki Olympic Stadium on 11 and 12 August 1971.

Medalists

Results

Final
12 August

Qualification
11 August

Participation
According to an unofficial count, 35 athletes from 18 countries participated in the event.

 (1)
 (1)
 (3)
 (2)
 (1)
 (3)
 (2)
 (3)
 (2)
 (1)
 (1)
 (1)
 (3)
 (1)
 (2)
 (2)
 (3)
 (3)

References

High jump
High jump at the European Athletics Championships
1971 in women's athletics